Multiplication factor may refer to:
Neutron multiplication factor, in a nuclear chain reaction
Multiplication factor, a term used in digital photography

See also
Multiplicative factor